Larry Lindsey Kimura (June 29, 1946 - ) was born in Waimea, Hawaii County, Hawaii, U.S.A., between his Nisei father Hisao Kimura, who had immigrated from Hiroshima, Japan, and his Hawaiian mother, Elizabeth Lindsey, who had been brought up in a predominantly Hawaiian-speaking family.

Kimura is a professor of the Hawaiian language and Hawaiian studies at the University of Hawaii, Hilo in the Ka Haka ʻUla O Keʻelikōlani, College of Hawaiian Language.  Kimura has been an advocate for the preservation of the Hawaiian language, and was a co-founder of ʻAha Pūnana Leo.

Astronomers consulted with Kimura to create Hawaiian names for the first observed interstellar asteroid, ʻOumuamua, the first imaged black hole, M87*, and other notable objects discovered or imaged from Hawaii.

Pōwehi (M87*)
In April 2019, astronomers operating the James Clerk Maxwell Telescope and Canada–France–Hawaii Telescope (part of the Event Horizon Telescope array), such as Doug Simons, approached Kimura to give a Hawaiian name to the recently imaged black hole M87* in the galaxy Messier 87, in recognition of the fact that the telescope was on Mauna Kea. Kimura came up with the name "Pōwehi", from pō 'darkness' or 'night' and wehi 'darkness' or 'adornment' to suggest "the adorned fathomless dark creation" or "embellished dark source of unending creation", found in the intensified form pōwehiwehi in the Kumulipo, a Hawaiian creation chant recorded in the 18th century.
(Pōwehiwehi means 'darkness streaked with glimmers of light', a generating agent of a stage in the development of life on earth as it advances toward the light, from pō 'darkness' and wehiwehi 'dappled shade'.)
The governor of Hawaii declared 10 April 2019 to be "Pōwehi Day". Unlike Oumuamua, however, the name Pōwehi has not been submitted to the IAU, as the IAU has no provision for accepting names for galaxies or black holes.

See also
 Language revival
 Linguistic rights

Notes

External links
ʻŌiwi TV 
 ʻAha Pūnana Leo: Language Nest
 Ka Haka ʻUla O Keʻelikōlani College of Hawaiian Language of the University of Hawaii at Hilo
 Native Hawaiian Education Act
 NSF

Living people
Linguists from the United States
Hawaiian language
Hawaiian studies
Native American language revitalization
University of Hawaiʻi faculty
Year of birth missing (living people)
American academics of Japanese descent
Hawaii people of Japanese descent